"Slinky Thing" is a song by Donald Fagen, appearing as the first track from his album, Sunken Condos. Telling the story of an older man seeking the affection and companionship of a significantly younger woman, the song details the events surrounding the two as they spend time together and endure comments made by others, who advise the narrator to "hold on to that slinky thing." The narrator himself thinks about if "she (the younger woman) needs somebody who's closer to her own age."

The song draws similarities with the Steely Dan songs Hey Nineteen and Janie Runaway, also about older men seeking relationships with younger women.

Personnel
Donald Fagen – lead vocal, piano, Prophet 5, background vocals
Michael Leonhart – trumpet, clavinet, vibraphone, percussion, glockenspiel, background vocals
Earl Cooke Jr (alias Michael Leonhart) – drums
Jon Herington – guitar
Walt Weiskopf – alto saxophone
Charlie Pillow – tenor saxophone
Roger Rosenberg – baritone saxophone
Jim Pugh – trombone
Jamie Leonhart – background vocals 
Catherine Russell – background vocals
Joe Martin – acoustic bass

See also
Age disparity in sexual relationships

References

Songs written by Donald Fagen
2012 songs